"Beyond the Call" is a song by Australian singer John Farnham recorded the song and released it as the third single from his album Age of Reason (1988).

Track listing
 "Beyond The Call" - 4:34
 "Blow By Blow" - 4:34
 "Blow By Blow"  (Extended 'Quake' Mix)  - 8:00

Chart history

References

1988 singles
John Farnham songs
1980s ballads
Pop ballads
Rock ballads
1988 songs
Songs written by David Batteau
Songs written by Darrell Brown (musician)